Traction motor manufacturers include:

References 

Traction motor manufacturers
Traction motor
Traction motor manufacturers